Sidney Sherwood (May 28, 1860 – August 5, 1901) was an American economist. He was a professor of economics at Johns Hopkins University from 1892 to 1901, where he succeeded his teacher Richard T. Ely who had left for the University of Wisconsin–Madison, as head of the political economy program. Although a student of Ely's, Sherwood was one of the early American Marginalists.

Sherwood died at age 41 in his hometown, Ballston, New York.

Bibliography

References

External links

1860 births
1901 deaths
People from Ballston, New York
Economists from New York (state)
Johns Hopkins University alumni
Princeton University alumni
Johns Hopkins University faculty